Alex Saundry (born 8 July 1992) is an Australian rules footballer who played for the Greater Western Sydney Giants in the AFL Women's competition. Saundry was recruited by Greater Western Sydney as a free agent in October 2016. She played four matches in her debut season. She was delisted by Greater Western Sydney at the end of the 2018 season.

References

External links 

1992 births
Living people
Greater Western Sydney Giants (AFLW) players
Australian rules footballers from Victoria (Australia)
Melbourne University Football Club (VFLW) players